The Shady Grove Primitive Baptist Church is a historic U.S. church in Gainesville, Florida. It is located at 804 Southwest Fifth Street. On October 5, 2005, it was added to the U.S. National Register of Historic Places.

References

External links

 Weekly List Of Actions Taken On Properties: 10/03/05 Through 10/07/05 at National Register of Historic Places

National Register of Historic Places in Gainesville, Florida
Churches on the National Register of Historic Places in Florida
Churches completed in 1935
20th-century Baptist churches in the United States
Buildings and structures in Gainesville, Florida
Churches in Alachua County, Florida
1935 establishments in Florida
Primitive Baptists